United Nations Security Council Resolution 241, adopted unanimously on November 15, 1967, after reaffirming past resolutions on the topic, the Council condemned any act of interference in the internal affairs of the Democratic Republic of the Congo, in particular the failure of Portugal to prevent mercenaries from using its colony in Angola as a base of operations for armed attacks against the DR Congo.  The Council called upon Portugal to put and immediate end to this and called upon all countries receiving mercenaries who had participated in the attacks against the DR Congo to take appropriate measures to prevent them from renewing their activities against any state.

See also
Congo Crisis
List of United Nations Security Council Resolutions 201 to 300 (1965–1971)
Portuguese Empire

References
Text of the Resolution at undocs.org

External links
 

 0241
 0241
 0241
 0241
Portuguese Angola
November 1967 events